Ruth Marie Ndoumbe Nvumba (born 1 January 1987 in Madrid) is a Spanish track and field athlete specializing in the triple jump and high jump.

She has an Equatoguinean mother and a Cameroonian father.

Competition record

Personal bests
Outdoor
High jump – 1.85 (Córdoba 2003)
Triple jump – 14.15 (Alcobendas 2014)
Indoor
Triple jump – 13.62 (Sabadell 2014)

References
IAAF profile

1987 births
Living people
Athletes from Madrid
Spanish people of Cameroonian descent
Spanish sportspeople of African descent
Spanish sportspeople of Equatoguinean descent
Spanish female high jumpers
Spanish female triple jumpers